Yamasong: March of the Hollows is a 2017 American stop motion animated dark fantasy film directed by Sam Koji Hale, and written by Hale and Ekaterina Sedia. It was produced by Adamo Paolo Cultraro, Mallory O'Meara and Sultan Saeed Al Darmaki. A sequel to the 2010 short film Yamasong by Hale, Yamasong: March of the Hollows was produced by Dark Dunes Productions and Taormina Films. It had its world premiere at the Bristol Festival of Puppetry in September 2017.

Plot 
On the planet Yamasong, a mechanical tribe called the Hollows, led by the rebellious Yari, has taken devastating measures to fight against ravenous beasts known as the Tricksters. Shojun, a Terrapin warrior who works with the cyborg Nani, tries to rally together three different factions—the mechanical Hollows, reptilian Terrapins and the horned Ovis—as their internal conflict threatens the culture of Yamasong's organic species.

Cast 
Nathan Fillion as Shojun
Abigail Breslin as Nani
Whoopi Goldberg as Yari
Freida Pinto as Geta
Peter Weller as Brujt
Malcolm McDowell as Lord Geer
George Takei as Elder Masook
Ed Asner as Elder Pyreez
Bruce Davison as P'Torr The Exile

Production 
Yamasong: March of the Hollows is a sequel to the 2010 short film Yamasong, created by writer-director Sam Koji Hale. Like the short film, March of the Hollows was made using puppet animation. The film was reportedly finished by May 2015.

Release 
Yamasong: March of the Hollows had its world premiere at the Bristol Festival of Puppetry in September 2017. It was released on video on demand on 23 April 2019 by Orchard Film.

References

External links 

2017 films
2017 animated films
American dark fantasy films
American science fantasy films
Cyborg films
2010s stop-motion animated films